Jan Baptist van der Hulst (2 March 1790 in Leuven – 16 May 1862 in Brussels) was a Flemish painter and lithographer.  He painted numerous members of the royal family of the Netherlands, and was known for his work in history painting as well.

1790 births
1862 deaths
19th-century Flemish painters
19th-century Belgian painters
19th-century Belgian male artists
Flemish printmakers
People from Leuven
19th-century painters of historical subjects